In algebraic topology and algebraic geometry, Leray's theorem (so named after Jean Leray) relates abstract sheaf cohomology with Čech cohomology.

References 
 Bonavero, Laurent. Cohomology of Line Bundles on Toric Varieties, Vanishing Theorems. Lectures 16-17 from "Summer School 2000: Geometry of Toric Varieties."

Sheaf theory
Theorems in algebraic geometry
Theorems in algebraic topology